Degmaptera mirabilis, the variegated hawkmoth, is a species of moth of the family Sphingidae. It is known from Nepal, north-eastern India, northern Thailand, Anhui in China and Taiwan. The habitat consists of high altitude evergreen oak forests.

The wingspan is 44–82 mm. The hindwing costal edge is excavated resulting in a conspicuous subapical lobe, which projects anteriorly. There is a central row of pale golden dots on the abdomen upperside and a fawn-colored band on the forewing upperside.

The larvae have been recorded feeding on Quercus fenestrata in the Khasi Hills in India

References

Smerinthini
Moths described in 1894